St. Wilfrid's Church, South Muskham is a parish church in the Church of England in South Muskham, Nottinghamshire.

The church is Grade I listed by the Department for Digital, Culture, Media and Sport as a building of outstanding architectural or historic interest.

History

The church is medieval but seems to have been subject to additions over a long period. The Tower shows three separate periods of construction. The lowest section is 13th century, the middle section is 14th century and the top is 15th century.

Parish structure

St. Wilfrid's Church, South Muskham is part of a joint parish which includes the churches of Church of St. Michael and All Angels, Averham, St. Wilfrid's Church, Kelham and St. Wilfrid's Church, North Muskham.

Organ

List of organists

James Harston 1870 - 1889

Sources
The Buildings of England, Nottinghamshire. Nikolaus Pevsner

References

Church of England church buildings in Nottinghamshire
Grade I listed churches in Nottinghamshire